Marianne Weber (born Marianne Schnitger; 2 August 1870 – 12 March 1954) was a German sociologist, women's rights activist and the wife of Max Weber.

Life

Childhood, 1870–1893
Marianne Schnitger was born on 2 August 1870 in Oerlinghausen to medical doctor Eduard Schnitger and his wife, Anna Weber, daughter of a prominent Oerlinghausen businessman Karl Weber. After the death of her mother in 1873, she moved to Lemgo and was raised for the next fourteen years by her grandmother and aunt. During this time, both her father and his two brothers went mad and were institutionalized.  When Marianne turned 16, Karl Weber sent her off to fashionable finishing schools in Lemgo and Hanover, from which she graduated when she was 19. After the death of her grandmother in 1889, she lived several years with her mother's sister, Alwine, in Oerlinghausen.
 
In 1891, Marianne began to spend time with the Charlottenburg Webers, Max Jr. and his mother, Helene, in particular.  She became very close to Helene, who she would refer to as being "unaware of her own inner beauty". In 1893, she and Max Weber married in Oerlinghausen and moved into their own apartment in Berlin.

Marriage, 1893–1920

During the first few years of their marriage, Max taught in Berlin, then, in 1894, at the University of Heidelberg. During this time, Marianne pursued her own studies. After moving to Freiburg in 1894, she studied with a leading neo-Kantian philosopher, Heinrich Rickert. She also began to engage herself in the women's movement after hearing prominent feminist speakers at a political congress in 1895. In 1896, in Heidelberg, she co-founded a society for the circulation of feminist thought.  She also worked with Max to raise the level of women students attending the university.

In 1898, Max suffered a psychological collapse, possibly brought on after his father's death, which happened shortly after Max confronted him regarding abuse of Helene. Between 1898 and 1904, Max withdrew from public life, moving in and out of mental institutions, traveling compulsively and resigning from his prominent position at University of Heidelberg. During this time, their roles reversed somewhat; as Max worked toward recovery and rested at home, Marianne attended political meetings, sometimes until late at night, and published her first book in 1900: Fichtes Sozialismus und sein Verhältnis zur Marxschen Doktrin ("Fichte's Socialism and its Relation to Marxist Doctrine").

In 1904, the Webers toured America.  In America, Marianne met both Jane Addams and Florence Kelley, both staunch feminists and active political reformers  Also during that year, Max re-entered the public sphere, publishing, among other things, The Protestant Ethic and the Spirit of Capitalism. Marianne also continued her own scholarship, publishing in 1907 her landmark work Ehefrau und Mutter in der Rechtsentwicklung ("Wife and Mother in the Development of Law").

In 1907, Karl Weber died, and left enough money to his granddaughter Marianne for the Webers to live comfortably.  During this time, Marianne first established her intellectual salon. Between 1907 and the start of World War I, Marianne enjoyed a rise in her status as an intellectual and a scholar as she published "The Question of Divorce" (1909), "Authority and Autonomy in Marriage" (1912) and "On the Valuation of Housework" (1912), and "Women and Objective Culture" (1913).  While the Webers presented a united front in public life, as Max defended his wife from her scholarly detractors, Max carried on an affair with Else Jaffe, a mutual friend.

In 1914, World War I broke out. While Max busied himself publishing his multi-volume study of religion, lecturing, organizing military hospitals, serving as an adviser in peace negotiations and running for office in the new Weimar Republic, Marianne published many works, among which were: "The New Woman" (1914), "The Ideal of Marriage" (1914), "War as an Ethical Problem" (1916), "Changing Types of University Women" (1917), "The Forces Shaping Sexual Life" (1919) and "Women's Special Cultural Tasks" (1919).

In 1918, Marianne Weber became a member of the German Democratic Party and, shortly thereafter, the first woman elected as a delegate in the federal state parliament of Baden. In 1919, she assumed the role of chairwoman of the Bund Deutscher Frauenvereine (League of German Women's Associations), an office she would hold until 1923.  In 1920, Max's sister Lili suddenly committed suicide, and Max and Marianne adopted her four children.  Shortly thereafter, Max Weber contracted pneumonia and died suddenly on 14 June 1920, leaving Marianne a widow with four children to raise.

Widowhood, 1920–1954
Following Max's unexpected death, Marianne withdrew from public and social life, funneling her physical and psychological resources into preparing ten volumes of her husband's writing for publication. In 1924, she received an honorary doctoral degree from the University of Heidelberg, both for her work in editing and publishing Max's work as well as for her own scholarship. Between 1923 and 1926, Weber worked on Max Weber: Ein Lebensbild ("Max Weber: A Biography"), which was published in 1926.  Also in 1926, she re-established her weekly salon, and entered into a phase of public speaking in which she spoke to audiences of up to 5,000. During this phase, she continued to raise Lili's children with the help of a close-knit circle of friends.

Marianne Weber in Nazi Germany
Weber's career as a feminist public speaker ended abruptly in 1935 when Hitler dissolved the League of German Women's Associations. During the time of the Nazi regime up until the Allied Occupation of Germany in 1945, she held a weekly salon.  While criticisms of Nazi atrocities were sometimes subtly implied, she told interviewer Howard Becker in 1945 that "we restricted ourselves to philosophical, religious and aesthetic topics, making our criticism of the Nazi system between the lines, as it were. None of us were the stuff of which martyrs were made." Weber did claim, however, to know people who had been involved in the July Plot.

Weber continued to write during this time, however, and published Frauen und Liebe ("Women and Love") in 1935 and Erfülltes Leben ("The Fulfilled Life") in 1942.

Later life
On 12 March 1954, Weber died in Heidelberg, in what was then West Germany.

Work

Themes
The basis of Weber's sociology was that of a woman in a patriarchal society. She wrote about the experiences of German women of her time, many of whom were entering the workforce for the very first time. This new exposure of women to the outside world led to shifting gender-based power dynamics within the household. The male-created and male-dominated institutions of law, religion, history and the economy provide a framework for the lives of women, whose autonomy suffers as a result. Weber also felt that the framework and structures of marriage can be used as a case-study for the larger society, as marriage, and the destiny of women to be married, is central to the lives of women, and could be seen across the spectrum of law, religion, history and economy. She acknowledged that while marriage could restrict the lives of women, it could also serve as a form of protection for women, serving to undermine "the brutal power of men by contract". Weber's work, especially the 1907 Wife and Mother in the Development of Law, was devoted to the analysis of the institution of marriage.  Her conclusion was that marriage is "a complex and ongoing negotiation over power and intimacy, in which money, women's work, and sexuality are key issues".

Another theme in her work was that women's work could be used to "map and explain the construction and reproduction of the social person and the social world". Human work creates cultural products ranging from small, daily values such as cleanliness and honesty to larger, more abstract phenomena like philosophy and language.  Between the two extremes lies a vast, unexplored middle territory called "the middle ground of immediate daily life", in which women, being the caretakers, child-rearers, and everyday economic actors of the family, have a large part. This middle ground is where the self is created, for the most part, Weber argued, and that self then affects other people in its daily actions in the world. She also felt that the continual struggle between the spiritual and the animal is what makes people human and that rather than being a crisis to be resolved, the conflict between the natural and the moral forms the basis of human dignity. This "millennial struggle of human beings for the subordination of instinctual life under the dominion of morally free human will" is a cultural product, for the production of which women are largely responsible. Finally, Weber also felt that differences such as class, education, age, and base ideologies, had an enormous effect on the day to day existences of women. She saw that there are profound differences not just between rural and urban women, but also among different types of rural women and different types of urban women. Urban women, of whom Weber was one, were distinguished not just by their husbands' occupations but also by their own. Within the class of working women, women's occupations (traditional women's work versus the elite: academics, artists, writers, etc) have an everyday effect upon patterns of daily life and lead to differences in needs, lifestyle and overall ideologies.

Georg Simmel and Marianne Weber
There has been discussion of Max Weber's scholarly connection to Georg Simmel, particularly in terms of their influence on the Frankfurt School, but Marianne Weber too was a colleague of Simmel. In addition to a more than 20 year friendship, in which Max and Simmel conversed and wrote letters often, Weber wrote a critical response to Simmel's 1911 essay "The Relative and the Absolute in the Problem of the Sexes", in which she criticized his concept of "gender relations". Both sociologists dealt with the "woman question" and, more broadly, "the interrelation between gendered modes of individuation, social differentiation and gender difference".

Publications
“Occupation and Marriage” (1906)
“Wife and Mother in the Development of Law” (1907)
“Authority and Autonomy” (1912)
“On The Valuation of Housework” (1912)
“Women and Objective Culture” (1913)
“Women, Men and Human Nature: The Critique by Marianne Weber”
“Women’s Special Cultural Tasks” (1919)

Select publications
Fichtes Sozialismus und sein Verhältnis zur Marschen Doktrin ("Fichte's Socialism and its Relation to Marxist Doctrine", 1900)
Beruf und Ehe ("Occupation and Marriage", 1906)
Ehefrau und Mutter in der Rechtsentwicklung ("Wife and Mother in the Development of Law", 1907)
Die Frage nach der Scheidung ("The Question of Divorce", 1909)
Autorität und Autonomie in der Ehe ("Authority and Autonomy in Marriage", 1912)
Über die Bewertung der Hausarbeit ("On the Valuation of Housework", 1912)
Frauen und Kultur ("Women and Objective Culture", 1913)
Max Weber. Ein Lebensbild ("Max Weber: A Biography", 1926)
Die Frauen und die Liebe ("Women and Love", 1935)
Erfülltes Leben ("The Fulfilled Life", 1942 - republished in 1946)
Lebenserinnerungen ("Memoirs", 1948)

See also
History of feminism
Feminism in Germany

Notes

Works Cited 
 "Marianne Weber (1870- 1954): A Woman-Centered Sociology," Patricia M. Lengermann and Jill Niebrugge-Brantley. The Women Founders: Sociology and Social Theory, 1830-1930 : a Text/reader. Boston: McGraw-Hill, 1998.
 Weber, Marianne. 1975. Max Weber: a biography. New York: Wiley.
 Scaff, Lawrence A. 1998. "The `cool objectivity of sociation': Max Weber and Marianne Weber in America." History Of The Human Sciences 11, no. 2: 61. Academic Search Premier, EBSCOhost (accessed 11 November 2011)
 "History of the German Women's Movement". Translated by Robert Burkhardt, assisted by members of the Translation Workshop organized by the Goethe-Institut. Boston, January–March 1998. http://www.trip.net/~bobwb/gwmtext/index.htm
 
 Wobbe, Theresa, 2004. "Elective affinities: Georg Simmel and Marianne Weber on gender and modernity."  Engendering the Social: Feminist Encounters with Sociological Theory. eds. Barbara L. Marshall and Anne Witz. Maidenhead, England: Open University Press.  pp 54–68.
 Weber, Marianne, 1913. "Authority and Autonomy in Marriage." trans. Craig R. Bermingham. Sociological Theory, Vol. 21, No. 2 (Jun. 2003), pp. 85–102.
 
 Lundskow, G. N. (2008). "The Sociology of Religion: a Substantive and Transdisciplinary approach". Los Angeles: SAGE.

External links
 
 (in German) (broken as of 27 November 2011)

Max Weber
Feminism and history
German women sociologists
German sociologists
German feminists
1870 births
1954 deaths
People from Lippe
People from the Principality of Lippe
German salon-holders